Garland Jeffreys is the first solo album by Garland Jeffreys.  It was released by Atlantic Records in 1973 and recorded at the Record Plant, New York City except "Bound to Get Ahead Someday" which was recorded in Kingston, Jamaica.

Track listing
All tracks composed by Garland Jeffreys
 "Ballad of Me" - 2:55
 "Harlem Bound" - 3:48
 "Calcutta Monsoon" - 4:52
 "Bound to Get Ahead Someday" - 3:43
 "Lovelight" - 4:16
 "She Didn't Lie" - 5:50
 "True to Me" - 2:25
 "Lon Chaney" - 4:05
 "Eggs" - 5:03
 "Zoo" - 2:15

Personnel 
Garland Jeffreys - vocals, acoustic guitar, percussion
Patti Austin - backing vocals
David Bromberg - dobro
Don Brooks - harmonica
Lynford "Hux" Brown - guitars
Lori Burton - backing vocals
Geoffrey Chung - guitars
Richard Davis - bass
Dr. John - piano, organ
Don Brooks - harmonica
Alan Freedman - guitars
Winston Grennan - drums
Paul Griffin - keyboards
Neville Hinds - organ
Jimmy Johnson, Jr. - drums
Denzel Laing - percussion
Ralph MacDonald - congas, percussion
Mike Mainieri - vibraphone, vocals
Adam Miller - backing vocals
David "Fathead" Newman - tenor saxophone
Chris Osborne - slide guitar
Larry Packer - violin, viola
The Persuasions - backing vocals
Bernard Purdie - drums
Chuck Rainey - bass
Albertine Robinson - backing vocals
John Simon - piano
Maretha Stewart - backing vocals
Winston Wright - piano
Technical
Carlton Lee, Dennis Ferrante, Jack Douglas, Roy Cicala - engineers
Anne Abelman - design
Steve Levitt - photography

References

External links 
 AMG review

1973 debut albums
Garland Jeffreys albums
Albums produced by Michael Cuscuna
Albums recorded at Record Plant (New York City)
Atlantic Records albums